How'd That Get On My Plate? is a television series on Food Network.

The show premiered in July 2008, and hosted by Sunny Anderson. The program investigates how various foods are produced (including honey, milk, eggs, strawberries, and cocoa in the first season), from their rawest form to their finished state, and features visits to food production factories throughout the United States.

External links 

Food Network original programming
2000s American reality television series
2008 American television series debuts
2008 American television series endings
Documentary television series about industry